Gonghe may refer to:

Gonghe Regency, a regency that ruled the Chinese Zhou dynasty from 841 to 828 BC
Gonghe County (共和县), of Hainan Tibetan Autonomous Prefecture, Qinghai Province, China